Luzonia is a genus of flowering plants in the legume family, Fabaceae. It belongs to the subfamily Faboideae. Found in the Philippines, its only species is Luzonia purpurea.

References 

Phaseoleae
Fabaceae genera

Flora of the Philippines